Trinaphthylene is a chemical compound of the group of Polycyclic aromatic hydrocarbon, can be obtained from triphthalylbenzene.

References 

Polycyclic aromatic hydrocarbons